Abouelfetoh Abdelrazek (born 12 February 1987) is an Egyptian male handball player for Smouha SC and the Egyptian national team.

He was a part of the team at the 2008 Summer Olympics.

References

External links
  

1987 births
Living people
Egyptian male handball players
Handball players at the 2008 Summer Olympics
Olympic handball players of Egypt
Place of birth missing (living people)
21st-century Egyptian people